Herbjørn Skogstad, pen name Herb (born 18 January 1946) is a Norwegian illustrator and editorial cartoonist.

Career
Born in Nordsinni in Nordre Land on 18 January 1946, a self-trained artist, Skogstad worked as illustrator and cartoonist for the newspaper Oppland Arbeiderblad from 1972, and for the media company Amedia. He has illustrated several books, and participated in exhibitions.

Selected works

References

External links
Herb

1946 births
Living people
People from Nordre Land
Norwegian illustrators
Norwegian caricaturists
Norwegian editorial cartoonists
20th-century Norwegian male artists
21st-century Norwegian male artists